1001 Inventions and the World of Ibn Al-Haytham is a 2015 part-animated film directed by Ahmed Salim and starring Omar Sharif. It is Sharif's final film.

The film was produced by 1001 Inventions, a British foundation aiming to promote the achievements of the Golden Age of Islam. 
Both the film and the exhibition were created to coincide with the United Nations campaign celebrating the International Year of Light, operated by UNESCO.

Within the film, Sharif's character helps his granddaughter with a challenging homework assignment about Ibn Al-Haytham, the eleventh century scholar  who made significant contributions to the principles of optics and visual perception.

See also
 List of Islamic films
 List of animated Islamic films
 Ahmed Salim

References

External links
 Official 1001 Inventions website

Islamic animated films
2010s educational films
2015 films
Ibn al-Haytham
Islam in the United Kingdom
2010s English-language films
British educational films